The Jordanian House of Senate currently consists of 65 members. This list includes all current senators serving in the 27th House of Senate of Jordan.

Leadership

Presiding officers

List of members 
All members of the House of Senate are personally appointed by King Abdullah II. The number of Senate members, including the Speaker, should not exceed half the House of Representatives members.

References 

Senators